Avant-garde music is music that is considered to be at the forefront of innovation in its field, with the term "avant-garde" implying a critique of existing aesthetic conventions, rejection of the status quo in favor of unique or original elements, and the idea of deliberately challenging or alienating audiences. Avant-garde music may be distinguished from experimental music by the way it adopts an extreme position within a certain tradition, whereas experimental music lies outside tradition.

Distinctions

Avant-garde music may be distinguished from experimental music by the way it adopts an extreme position within a certain tradition, whereas experimental music lies outside tradition. In a historical sense, some musicologists use the term "avant-garde music" for the radical compositions that succeeded the death of Anton Webern in 1945, but others disagree. For example, Ryan Minor writes that this period began with the work of Richard Wagner, whereas Edward Lowinsky cites Josquin des Prez. The term may also be used to refer to any post-1945 tendency of modernist music not definable as experimental music, though sometimes including a type of experimental music characterized by the rejection of tonality. A commonly cited example of avant-garde music is John Cage's 4'33" (1952), a piece which instructs the performer(s) not to play their instrument(s) during its entire duration. The piece has been described as "not a musical ‘work’ in the normal sense, only an occasion for a Zen-like meditation".

Although some modernist music is also avant-garde, a distinction can be made between the two categories. According to scholar Larry Sitsky, because the purpose of avant-garde music is necessarily political, social, and cultural critique, so that it challenges social and artistic values by provoking or goading audiences, composers such as Igor Stravinsky, Richard Strauss, Arnold Schoenberg, Anton Webern, George Antheil and Claude Debussy may reasonably be considered to have been avant-gardists in their early works (which were understood as provocative, whether or not the composers intended them that way), but Sitsky does not consider the label appropriate for their later music. For example, modernists of the post–World War II period, such as Milton Babbitt, Luciano Berio, Elliott Carter, György Ligeti, and Witold Lutosławski, never conceived their music for the purpose of goading an audience and cannot, therefore, be classified as avant-garde. Composers such as John Cage and Harry Partch, on the contrary, remained avant-gardists throughout their creative careers.

A prominent feature of avant-garde music is to break through various rules and regulations of traditional culture, in order to transcend established creative principles and appreciation habits. Avant-garde music pursues novelty in musical form and style, insisting that art is above everything else; thus, it creates a transcendental and mysterious sound world. Hint, metaphor, symbol, association, imagery, synesthesia and perception are widely used in avant-garde music techniques to excavate the mystery of human heart and the flow of consciousness, so that many seemingly unrelated but essentially very important events interweave into multi-level structures and forms.

Performers 

 Peter Brötzmann
 Anthony Braxton
 The Mothers of Invention
 The Residents
 Neu!
 Faust
 Henry Cow
 The Pop Group
 Swans

Popular music

Popular music, by definition, is designed for mass appeal. The 1960s saw a wave of avant-garde experimentation in jazz, represented by artists such as Ornette Coleman, Sun Ra, Albert Ayler, Archie Shepp, John Coltrane and Miles Davis. In the rock music of the 1970s, the "art" descriptor was generally understood to mean "aggressively avant-garde" or "pretentiously progressive". Post-punk artists from the late 1970s rejected traditional rock sensibilities in favor of an avant-garde aesthetic. In 1988 the writer Greg Tate described hip hop music as "the only avant-garde around, still delivering the shock of the new."

See also
Lo-fi
Danger music
Industrial music
Lowercase music

Contemporary/classical music

Popular/traditional music

References

Further reading
 Gendron, Bernard. 2002. Between Montmartre and the Mudd Club: Popular Music and the Avant-Garde. Chicago: University of Chicago Press. .
 Griffiths, Paul. 1981. Modern Music: The Avant Garde Since 1945. London: J. M. Dent and Sons Ltd.; New York: George Braziller. .
 Stubbs, David. Fear of Music: Why People Get Rothko but Don't Get Stockhausen, UK: Zero Books, 2009, .

 
Experimental music
20th century in music
Avant-garde art